The Pepsi Music Festival was a major Argentine music festival, held annually since 2003. Since 2005, it has been named after its main sponsor, Pepsi; before it was named after its previous sponsor, Quilmes, and it was known as "Quilmes Rock". It was held in several places in Buenos Aires, including the Ferro Stadium and River Plate Stadium. Since 2005, it has been held at Obras Stadium. It is the largest and longest music festival in the country, with more than 200,000 people attending in 2006, over 10 days.

The most important national rock singers and groups participated of the festival, along with some of the most notable international rock stars.

Annual festivals and musical acts

References

Rock festivals in Argentina
Music festivals in Argentina
Festivals in Buenos Aires
Music festivals established in 2003
Spring (season) events in Argentina